Marta Nedvědová (born 8 December 1976 in Prague) is a Czech sport shooter. She competed at the 1996 Summer Olympics in the women's 50 metre rifle three positions event, in which she tied for twelfth place, and the women's 10 metre air rifle event, in which she placed sixth.

References

1976 births
Living people
ISSF rifle shooters
Czech female sport shooters
Shooters at the 1996 Summer Olympics
Olympic shooters of the Czech Republic
Sportspeople from Prague
20th-century Czech women